Words of Wisdom and Hope is an album produced in collaboration between Glasgow, Scotland's Teenage Fanclub and Half Japanese frontman Jad Fair. It was released on 4 March 2002 on Domino's subsidiary label Geographic in Europe and on Alternative Tentacles in the US.

Critical reception
NME wrote that "with amiable janglers the Fanclub providing a predictibly pleasant backdrop, Jad‘s syrupy ruminations on life -think Lou Reed on prozac- take on a certain primitive charm." The Guardian wrote that "Teenage Fanclub make an ideal backing band, providing soft bubbles of guitar in 'Love Will Conquer' and bringing a surprisingly soulful touch to 'Power of Your Tenderness' and 'You Rock.'"

Track listing

Personnel
Adapted from the album's liner notes.

Jad Fair — vocals
Norman Blake — guitar, bass, keyboards
Raymond McGinley — guitar, mandola
Finlay Macdonald — keyboards, bass
Gerard Love — guitar, bass, drums
Paul Quinn — drums, guitar
Additional musicians
Katrina Mitchell — vocals, drums
Technical
Teenage Fanclub — producer
Jad Fair — producer, cover art
Johnny Cameron — engineer
Steve Rooke — mastering

References

2002 albums
Collaborative albums
Domino Recording Company albums
Jad Fair albums
Teenage Fanclub albums